Joel Michael McKeithan (born August 15, 1991) is an American professional baseball coach. He is the assistant hitting coach for the Cincinnati Reds of Major League Baseball.

McKeithan graduated from T. C. Roberson High School in Asheville, North Carolina. He enrolled at Vanderbilt University and played college baseball for the Vanderbilt Commodores. He transferred to North Carolina State University and finished his college baseball career with the NC State Wolfpack.

In 2019, McKeithan served as a minor league hitting coach for the Williamsport Crosscutters, a farm team in the Philadelphia Phillies organization. He was the minor league hitting coordinator for the Detroit Tigers for the 2021 season. After the 2021 season, the Reds hired McKeithan to their major league coaching staff as their assistant hitting coach.

His great-uncle, Tim McKeithan, pitched in MLB. His grandfather, Jerry Sr., played in the minor leagues, while his father played college baseball for NC State and UNC Charlotte. His brother, also named Tim, is a coach for the Pittsburgh Pirates organization, and his other brother, Aaron, plays in the minor leagues for the Cardinals organization.

References

External links

Living people
Cincinnati Reds coaches
Major League Baseball hitting coaches
Sportspeople from Asheville, North Carolina
Vanderbilt Commodores baseball players
NC State Wolfpack baseball players
1991 births
Southern Illinois Miners players
Gateway Grizzlies players
Lake Erie Crushers players